The Pakistan women's national shooting team represents Pakistan in international shooting competitions. It is administered by the National Rifle Association of Pakistan (NRAP). Members of the team compete in both rifle and pistol events at competitions including the continental and regional games (Asian and South Asian Games). In 2016, Minhal Sohail became the first  woman sports shooter from Pakistan to compete at the Summer Olympic Games when she participated on a quota place at the Rio Games.

Members

Results

Asian Games

South Asian Games

References

Shooting
Women's sport in Pakistan